Morris Performing Arts Center (originally Palace Theatre and formerly Morris Civic Auditorium) is a 2,564-seat concert hall located in South Bend, Indiana.  It opened in 1922 as a vaudeville house and later became a movie palace.  It was developed along with the neighboring Palais Royale Building by the Palace Theater Corporation. It is a four- to five-story, rectangular, Spanish Renaissance Revival style brick building with finely crafted terra cotta ornamentation. It was planned for demolition in 1959 but was saved from demolition, and between 1998 and 2000, it was restored and remodeled.

Today, Morris Performing Arts Center's interior features a rose, blue and cream color scheme, as it originally did when it opened.  The theater's stage, which measures 56 feet by 57 feet and contains a red and gold main curtain, dates from the 2000 restoration.  The theater is home to the South Bend Symphony Orchestra and also hosts Broadway shows, concerts, and other special events, including Marian High School's annual commencement ceremony.  The theater's interior is notable for borrowing from European architectural styles.  
More than half of the seats at Morris Performing Arts Center — 1,282 are in the balcony.  The remainder of the seats are in the lower level.

In 1985, the center was listed on the National Register of Historic Places.  It qualified for historic designation both because of its place in the area's history and because of its historically significant architecture.

In 2022, the theater celebrated its 100th year in existence, and on November 2nd of that year, a documentary commemorating the anneversary aired on the local PBS affiliate, WNIT.

References

Concert halls in Indiana
Music venues in Indiana
Theatres on the National Register of Historic Places in Indiana
Performing arts centers in Indiana
Renaissance Revival architecture in Indiana
Theatres completed in 1922
Tourist attractions in South Bend, Indiana
Buildings and structures in South Bend, Indiana
National Register of Historic Places in St. Joseph County, Indiana